Li Lirong (born 19 April 1963) is a Chinese handball player. She competed in the women's tournament at the 1988 Summer Olympics.

References

1963 births
Living people
Chinese female handball players
Olympic handball players of China
Handball players at the 1988 Summer Olympics
Place of birth missing (living people)